Catherine II (born Sophie of Anhalt-Zerbst; 2 May 172917 November 1796), most commonly known as Catherine the Great, was the reigning empress of Russia from 1762 to 1796. She came to power after overthrowing her husband, Peter III. Under her long reign, inspired by the ideas of the Enlightenment, Russia experienced a renaissance of culture and sciences, which led to the founding of many new cities, universities, and theatres, along with large-scale immigration from the rest of Europe and the recognition of Russia as one of the great powers of Europe.

In her accession to power and her rule of the empire, Catherine often relied on her noble favourites, most notably Count Grigory Orlov and Grigory Potemkin. Assisted by highly successful generals such as Alexander Suvorov and Pyotr Rumyantsev, and admirals such as Samuel Greig and Fyodor Ushakov, she governed at a time when the Russian Empire was expanding rapidly by conquest and diplomacy. In the south the Crimean Khanate was crushed following victories over the Bar Confederation and Ottoman Empire in the Russo-Turkish War. With the support of Great Britain, Russia colonised the territories of New Russia along the coasts of the Black and Azov Seas. In the west the Polish–Lithuanian Commonwealth, ruled by Catherine's former lover King Stanisław August Poniatowski, was eventually partitioned, with the Russian Empire gaining the largest share. In the east Russians became the first Europeans to colonise Alaska, establishing Russian America.

Many cities and towns were founded on Catherine's orders in the newly conquered lands, most notably Odessa, Yekaterinoslav (today known as Dnipro), Kherson, Nikolayev, and Sevastopol. An admirer of Peter the Great, Catherine continued to modernise Russia along Western European lines. However, military conscription and the economy continued to depend on serfdom, and the increasing demands of the state and of private landowners intensified the exploitation of serf labour. This was one of the chief reasons behind rebellions, including Pugachev's Rebellion of Cossacks, nomads, peoples of the Volga, and peasants.

The Manifesto on Freedom of the Nobility, issued during the short reign of Peter III and confirmed by Catherine, freed Russian nobles from compulsory military or state service. The construction of many mansions of the nobility, in the classical style endorsed by the empress, changed the face of the country. She is often included in the ranks of the enlightened despots. As a patron of the arts, she presided over the age of the Russian Enlightenment, including the establishment of the Smolny Institute of Noble Maidens, the first state-financed higher education institution for women in Europe.

Early life 

Catherine was born in Stettin, Province of Pomerania, Kingdom of Prussia, Holy Roman Empire, as Princess Sophie Friederike Auguste von Anhalt-Zerbst-Dornburg. Her mother was Joanna Elisabeth of Holstein-Gottorp. Her father, Christian August, Prince of Anhalt-Zerbst, belonged to the ruling German family of Anhalt. He failed to become the duke of the Duchy of Courland and Semigallia, and at the time of his daughter's birth, he held the rank of a Prussian general in his capacity as governor of the city of Stettin. However, because her second cousin Peter III converted to Orthodox Christianity, her mother's brother became the heir to the Swedish throne and two of her first cousins, Gustav III and Charles XIII, later became Kings of Sweden. In accordance with the then-prevailing custom among the ruling dynasties of Germany, she received her education chiefly from a French governess and from tutors. According to her memoirs, Sophie was regarded as a tomboy and trained herself to master a sword.

Sophie found her childhood to be quite uneventful; she once wrote to her correspondent Baron Grimm, "I see nothing of interest in it". Although Sophie was born a princess, her family had very little money; her rise to power was supported by her mother Joanna's wealthy relatives, who were both nobles and royal relations. The more than 300 sovereign entities of the Holy Roman Empire, many of them quite small and powerless, made for a highly competitive political system in which the various princely families fought for advantages over one another, often by way of political marriages. For smaller German princely families, an advantageous marriage was one of the best means of advancing their interests, and the young Sophie was groomed throughout her childhood to become the wife of a powerful ruler in order to improve the position of her house. In addition to her native German, Sophie became fluent in French, the lingua franca of European elites in the 18th century. The young Sophie received the standard education for an 18th-century German princess, concentrating on etiquette, French, and Lutheran theology.

Sophie first met her future husband and second cousin, the future Peter III of Russia, at the age of 10. Based on her writings, she found Peter detestable upon meeting him. She disliked his pale complexion and his fondness for alcohol. She later wrote that she stayed at one end of the castle and Peter at the other.

Marriage and reign of Peter III 

The choice of Princess Sophie as wife of the future tsar was a result of the Lopukhina affair, in which Count Jean Armand de Lestocq and King Frederick the Great of Prussia took an active part. The objective was to strengthen the friendship between Prussia and Russia, to weaken the influence of Austria, and to overthrow the chancellor Alexey Bestuzhev-Ryumin, a known partisan of the Austrian alliance on whom the reigning Russian Empress Elizabeth relied. The diplomatic intrigue failed, largely due to the intervention of Sophie's mother, Joanna Elisabeth of Holstein-Gottorp. Historical accounts portray Joanna as a cold, abusive woman who loved gossip and court intrigues. Her hunger for fame centred on her daughter's prospects of becoming Empress of Russia, but Joanna also infuriated Empress Elizabeth, who eventually banned her from the country for allegedly spying for King Frederick. Empress Elizabeth knew the family well and had intended to marry Princess Joanna's brother Charles Augustus (Karl August von Holstein); however, he had died of smallpox in 1727, before the wedding could take place. Despite Joanna's interference, Empress Elizabeth took a strong liking to Sophie, and Sophie and Peter were eventually married in 1745.

When Sophie arrived in Russia in 1744, she spared no effort to ingratiate herself not only with Empress Elizabeth, but also with her husband and with the Russian people at large. She zealously applied herself to learning the Russian language, rising late at night to repeat her lessons in her bedroom. In her memoirs, she wrote that she made the decision then to do whatever was necessary and to profess to believe whatever was required of her to become qualified to wear the crown. Although she came to master the language, she retained an accent.

Sophie recalled in her memoirs that as soon as she arrived in Russia, she fell ill with a pleuritis that almost killed her. She credited her survival to frequent bloodletting; in a single day, she received four phlebotomies. Her mother's opposition to this practice brought her the Empress's disfavour. When Sophie's situation looked desperate, her mother wanted her confessed by a Lutheran pastor. Awaking from her delirium, however, Sophie said, "I don't want any Lutheran; I want my Orthodox father [clergyman]". This further raised her in the Empress's esteem.

Princess Sophie's father, a devout German Lutheran, opposed his daughter's conversion to Eastern Orthodoxy. Despite his objections, on 28 June 1744, the Russian Orthodox Church received Princess Sophie as a member. It was then that she took the new name Catherine (Yekaterina or Ekaterina) and the (artificial) patronymic Алексеевна (Alekseyevna, daughter of Aleksey), so that she was in all respects the namesake of Catherine I, the mother of Empress Elizabeth and the grandmother of Peter III. The following year, on 21 August 1745, the long-planned dynastic marriage between Catherine and Peter finally took place in Saint Petersburg. Catherine had recently turned 16. Her father did not travel to Russia for the wedding. The bridegroom, then known as Peter von Holstein-Gottorp, had become Duke of Holstein-Gottorp (located in the north-west of  Germany near the border with Denmark) in 1739. The newlyweds settled in the palace of Oranienbaum, which remained the residence of the "young court" for many years. From there, they governed the duchy (which occupied less than a third of the current German state of Schleswig-Holstein, even including that part of Schleswig occupied by Denmark) to obtain experience to govern Russia.

Apart from providing that experience, the marriage was unsuccessful; it was not consummated for years due to Peter III's mental immaturity. After Peter took a mistress, Catherine became involved with other prominent court figures. She soon became popular with several powerful political groups that opposed her husband. Bored with her husband, Catherine became an avid reader of books, mostly in French. She disparaged her husband for his devotion to reading on the one hand "Lutheran prayer-books, the other the history of and trial of some highway robbers who had been hanged or broken on the wheel". It was during this period that she first read Voltaire and the other philosophes of the French Enlightenment. As she learned Russian, she became increasingly interested in the literature of her adopted country. Finally, it was the Annals by Tacitus that caused what she called a "revolution" in her teenage mind as Tacitus was the first intellectual she read who understood power politics as they are, not as they should be. She was especially impressed with his argument that people do not act for their professed idealistic reasons, and instead she learned to look for the "hidden and interested motives".

According to Alexander Hertzen, who edited a version of Catherine's memoirs, Catherine had her first sexual relationship with Sergei Saltykov while living at Oranienbaum, as her marriage to Peter had not yet been consummated, as Catherine later claimed. Nonetheless, Catherine would eventually leave the final version of her memoirs to her son, the future Paul I, in which she explained why Paul had been Peter's son. Sergei Saltykov was used to make Peter jealous, and did not desire to have a child with him; Catherine wanted to become empress herself, and did not want another heir to the throne; however, Empress Elizabeth blackmailed Peter and Catherine to produce this heir. Peter and Catherine had both been involved in a 1749 Russian military plot to crown Peter (together with Catherine) in Elizabeth's stead. As a result of this plot, Elizabeth likely wanted to deny both Catherine and Peter any rights to the Russian throne. Elizabeth, therefore, allowed Catherine to have sexual lovers only after a new legal heir, Catherine and Peter's son Paul, survived and appeared to be strong.

After this, Catherine carried on sexual liaisons over the years with many men, including Stanislaus Augustus Poniatowski, Grigory Grigoryevich Orlov (1734–1783), Alexander Vasilchikov, Grigory Potemkin, Ivan Rimsky-Korsakov, and others. She became friends with Princess Ekaterina Vorontsova-Dashkova, the sister of her husband's official mistress. In Dashkov's opinion, Dashkov introduced Catherine to several powerful political groups that opposed her husband; however, Catherine had been involved in military schemes against Elizabeth with the likely goal of subsequently getting rid of Peter III since at least 1749.

Peter III's temperament became quite unbearable for those who resided in the palace. He would announce trying drills in the morning to male servants, who later joined Catherine in her room to sing and dance until late hours.

In 1759, Catherine became pregnant with her second child, Anna, who only lived to 14 months. Due to various rumours of Catherine's promiscuity, Peter was led to believe he was not the child's biological father and is known to have proclaimed, "Go to the devil!" when Catherine angrily dismissed his accusation. She therefore spent much of this time alone in her private boudoir to hide away from Peter's abrasive personality. In the first version of her memoirs, edited and published by Alexander Hertzen, Catherine strongly implied that the real father of her son Paul was not Peter, but rather Saltykov.

Catherine recalled in her memoirs her optimistic and resolute mood before her accession to the throne:

I used to say to myself that happiness and misery depend on ourselves. If you feel unhappy, raise yourself above unhappiness, and so act that your happiness may be independent of all eventualities.

After the death of the Empress Elizabeth on 5 January 1762 (OS: 25 December 1761), Peter succeeded to the throne as Emperor Peter III, and Catherine became empress consort. The imperial couple moved into the new Winter Palace in Saint Petersburg. The Emperor's eccentricities and policies, including his great admiration for the Prussian King Frederick II, alienated the same groups that Catherine had cultivated as allies. Russia and Prussia had fought each other during the Seven Years' War (1756–1763), and Russian troops had occupied Berlin in 1761. Peter, however, supported Frederick II, eroding much of his support among the nobility. Peter ceased Russian operations against Prussia, and Frederick suggested the partition of Polish territories with Russia. Peter also intervened in a dispute between his Duchy of Holstein and Denmark over the province of Schleswig (see Count Johann Hartwig Ernst von Bernstorff). As Duke of Holstein-Gottorp, Peter planned war against Denmark, Russia's traditional ally against Sweden.

In July 1762, barely six months after becoming emperor, Peter lingered in Oranienbaum with his Holstein-born courtiers and relatives, while Catherine lived in another palace nearby. On the night of 8 July 1762 (OS: 27 June 1762), Catherine was given the news that one of her co-conspirators had been arrested by her estranged husband and that the coup they had been planning would have to take place at once. The next day, she left the palace and departed for the Ismailovsky Regiment, where she delivered a speech asking the soldiers to protect her from her husband. Catherine then left with the Ismailovsky Regiment to go to the Semenovsky Barracks, where the clergy was waiting to ordain her as the sole occupant of the Russian throne, and began her reign as Empress of Russia as Catherine II. She had her husband arrested and forced him to sign a document of abdication, leaving no one to dispute her accession to the throne. On 17 July 1762—eight days after the coup that amazed the outside world and just six months after his accession to the throne—Peter III died at Ropsha, possibly at the hands of Alexei Orlov (younger brother to Grigory Orlov, then a court favourite and a participant in the coup). Peter supposedly was assassinated, but it is unknown how he died. The official cause, after an autopsy, was a severe attack of haemorrhoidal colic and an apoplexy stroke.

At the time of Peter III's overthrow, other potential rivals for the throne included Ivan VI (1740–1764), who had been confined at Schlüsselburg in Lake Ladoga from the age of six months and was thought to be insane. Ivan VI was assassinated during an attempt to free him as part of a failed coup against Catherine. Like Empress Elizabeth before her, Empress Catherine had given strict instructions that Ivan was to be killed in the event of any such attempt. Yelizaveta Alekseyevna Tarakanova (1753–1775) was another potential rival.

Although Catherine did not descend from the Romanov dynasty, her ancestors included members of the Rurik dynasty, which had preceded the Romanovs as rulers of Russia. She succeeded her husband as empress regnant, following the precedent of Empress Catherine I, who had succeeded her husband Peter the Great in 1725. Historians debate Catherine's technical status, whether as a regent or as a usurper, tolerable only during the minority of her son, Grand Duke Paul.

Reign (1762–1796)

Coronation (1762) 

Catherine II was crowned at the Assumption Cathedral in Moscow on 22 September 1762. Her coronation marks the creation of one of the main treasures of the Romanov dynasty, the Imperial Crown of Russia, designed by Swiss-French court diamond jeweller Jérémie Pauzié. Inspired by Byzantine design, the crown was constructed of two half spheres, one gold and one silver, representing the Eastern and Western Roman Empires, divided by a foliate garland and fastened with a low hoop. The crown contains 75 pearls and 4,936 Indian diamonds forming laurel and oak leaves, the symbols of power and strength, and is surmounted by a 398.62-carat ruby spinel that previously belonged to the Empress Elizabeth, and a diamond cross. The crown was produced in a record two months and weighed 2.3 kg (5.1 lbs). From 1762, the Great Imperial Crown was the coronation crown of all Romanov emperors until the monarchy's abolition in 1917. It is one of the main treasures of the Romanov dynasty and is now on display in the Moscow Kremlin Armoury Museum.

Foreign affairs 

Catherine's foreign minister, Nikita Panin (in office 1763–1781), exercised considerable influence from the beginning of Catherine's reign. A shrewd statesman, Panin dedicated much effort and millions of rubles to setting up a "Northern Accord" between Russia, Prussia, Poland, and Sweden to counter the power of the Bourbon–Habsburg League. When it became apparent that his plan could not succeed, Panin fell out of favour with Catherine and she had him replaced with Ivan Osterman (in office 1781–1797).

Catherine agreed to a commercial treaty with Great Britain in 1766, but stopped short of a full military alliance. Although she could see the benefits of Britain's friendship, she was wary of Britain's increased power following its complete victory in the Seven Years' War, which threatened the European balance of power.

Russo-Turkish Wars 

Peter the Great had succeeded in gaining a foothold in the south, on the edge of the Black Sea, during the Azov campaigns. Catherine completed the conquest of the south, making Russia the dominant power in the Balkans following the Russo-Turkish War of 1768–1774. Russia inflicted some of the heaviest defeats ever suffered by the Ottoman Empire, including at the Battle of Chesma (5–7 July 1770) and the Battle of Kagul (21 July 1770). In 1769, a last major Crimean–Nogai slave raid, which ravaged the Russian held territories in Ukraine, saw the capture of up to 20,000 slaves.

The Russian victories procured access to the Black Sea and allowed Catherine's government to incorporate present-day southern Ukraine, where the Russians founded the new cities of Odessa, Nikolayev, Yekaterinoslav (literally: "the Glory of Catherine"), and Kherson. The Treaty of Küçük Kaynarca, signed 10 July 1774, gave the Russians territories at Azov, Kerch, Yenikale, Kinburn, and the small strip of Black Sea coast between the rivers Dnieper and Bug. The treaty also removed restrictions on Russian naval and commercial traffic in the Azov Sea, granted Russia the position of protector of Orthodox Christians in the Ottoman Empire, and made Crimea a protectorate of Russia. In 1770, Russia's State Council announced a policy in favour of eventual Crimean independence. Catherine named Şahin Giray, a Crimean Tatar leader, to head the Crimean state and maintain friendly relations with Russia. His period of rule proved disappointing after repeated effort to prop up his regime through military force and monetary aid. Finally, Catherine annexed Crimea in 1783. The palace of the Crimean Khanate passed into the hands of the Russians. In 1787, Catherine conducted a triumphal procession in the Crimea, which helped provoke the next Russo-Turkish War.

The Ottomans restarted hostilities with Russia in the Russo-Turkish War of 1787–1792. This war was another catastrophe for the Ottomans, ending with the Treaty of Jassy (1792), which legitimised the Russian claim to the Crimean peninsula and granted the Yedisan region to Russia.

Russo-Persian War 

In the Treaty of Georgievsk (1783), Russia agreed to protect Georgia against any new invasions and further political aspirations of their Persian suzerains. Catherine waged a new war against Persia in 1796 after they, under the new king Agha Mohammad Khan, again invaded Georgia and established rule in 1795, expelling the newly established Russian garrisons in the Caucasus. The ultimate goal for the Russian government, however, was to topple the anti-Russian shah (king), and to replace him with his pro-Russian half-brother Morteza Qoli Khan, who had defected to Russia.

It was widely expected that a 13,000-strong Russian corps would be led by the seasoned general, Ivan Gudovich, but the Empress followed the advice of her lover, Prince Zubov, and entrusted the command to his youthful brother, Count Valerian Zubov. The Russian troops set out from Kizlyar in April 1796 and stormed the key fortress of Derbent on 10 May. The event was glorified by the court poet Derzhavin in his famous ode; he later commented bitterly on Zubov's inglorious return from the expedition in another famous poem.

By mid-June 1796, Zubov's troops easily overran most of the territory of modern-day Azerbaijan, including three principal cities—Baku, Shemakha, and Ganja. By November, they were stationed at the confluence of the Araks and Kura Rivers, poised to attack mainland Iran. In this month, the Empress Catherine II died, and her son and successor Paul I, who detested that the Zubovs had other plans for the army, ordered the troops to retreat to Russia. This reversal aroused the frustration and enmity of the powerful Zubovs and other officers who took part in the campaign; many of them would be among the conspirators who arranged Paul's murder five years later.

Relations with Western Europe 

Catherine longed for recognition as an enlightened sovereign. She refused the Duchy of Holstein-Gottorp, which had ports on the coast of the Atlantic Ocean, and refrained from having a Russian army in Germany. Instead, she pioneered for Russia the role that Britain later played through most of the 19th and early 20th centuries as an international mediator in disputes that could, or did, lead to war. She acted as mediator in the War of the Bavarian Succession (1778–1779) between the German states of Prussia and Austria. In 1780, she established a League of Armed Neutrality, designed to defend neutral shipping from being searched by the British Royal Navy during the American Revolutionary War.

From 1788 to 1790, Russia fought a war against Sweden instigated by Catherine's cousin, King Gustav III of Sweden, who expected to overrun the Russian armies still engaged in war against the Ottomans and hoped to strike Saint Petersburg directly. But Russia's Baltic Fleet checked the Royal Swedish navy in the tied Battle of Hogland (July 1788), and the Swedish army failed to advance. Denmark declared war on Sweden in 1788 (the Theatre War). After the decisive defeat of the Russian fleet at the Battle of Svensksund in 1790, the parties signed the Treaty of Värälä (14 August 1790), returning all conquered territories to their respective owners and confirming the Treaty of Åbo. Russia was to stop any involvement in the internal affairs of Sweden. Large sums were paid to Gustav III, and peace ensued for 20 years even in spite of the assassination of Gustav III in 1792.

Partitions of Polish–Lithuanian Commonwealth 

In 1764, Catherine placed Stanislaus Augustus Poniatowski, her former lover, on the Polish throne. Although the idea of partitioning Poland came from the King Frederick II of Prussia, Catherine took a leading role in its execution in the 1790s. In 1768, she formally became the protector of the political rights of dissidents and peasants of the Polish–Lithuanian Commonwealth, which provoked an anti-Russian uprising in Poland, the Confederation of Bar (1768–1772), supported by France. After the rebels, their French and European volunteers, and their allied Ottoman Empire had been defeated, she established in the Commonwealth a system of government fully controlled by the Russian Empire through a Permanent Council, under the supervision of her ambassadors and envoys.

Fearing that the May Constitution of Poland (1791) might lead to a resurgence in the power of the Polish–Lithuanian Commonwealth and the growing democratic movements inside the Commonwealth might become a threat to the European monarchies, Catherine decided to refrain from her planned intervention into France and to intervene in Poland instead. She provided support to a Polish anti-reform group known as the Targowica Confederation. After defeating Polish loyalist forces in the Polish–Russian War of 1792 and in the Kościuszko Uprising (1794), Russia completed the partitioning of Poland, dividing all of the remaining Commonwealth territory with Prussia and Austria (1795).

Relations with China
The Qianlong Emperor of China was committed to an expansionist policy in Central Asia and saw the Russian Empire as a potential rival, making for difficult and unfriendly relations between Beijing and Saint Petersburg. In 1762, he unilaterally abrogated the Treaty of Kyakhta, which governed the caravan trade between the two empires. Another source of tension was the wave of Dzungar Mongol fugitives from the Chinese state who took refuge with the Russians. The Dzungar genocide which was committed by the Qing state had led many Dzungars to seek sanctuary in the Russian Empire, and it was also one of the reasons for the abrogation of the Treaty of Kyakhta. Catherine perceived that the Qianlong Emperor was an unpleasant and arrogant neighbour, once saying: "I shall not die until I have ejected the Turks from Europe, suppressed the pride of China and established trade with India". In a 1790 letter to Baron de Grimm written in French, she called the Qianlong Emperor "mon voisin chinois aux petits yeux" ("my Chinese neighbour with small eyes").

Relations with Japan 
In the Far East, Russians became active in fur trapping in Kamchatka and the Kuril Islands. This spurred Russian interest in opening trade with Japan to the south for supplies and food. In 1783, storms drove a Japanese sea captain, Daikokuya Kōdayū, ashore in the Aleutian Islands, at that time Russian territory. Russian local authorities helped his party, and the Russian government decided to use him as a trade envoy. On 28 June 1791, Catherine granted Daikokuya an audience at Tsarskoye Selo. Subsequently, in 1792, the Russian government dispatched a trade mission to Japan, led by Adam Laxman. The Tokugawa shogunate received the mission, but negotiations failed.

The evaluation of foreign policy
Nicholas I, her grandson, evaluated the foreign policy of Catherine the Great as a dishonest one. Catherine failed to reach any of the initial goals she had put forward. Her foreign policy lacked a long-term strategy and from the very start was characterised by a series of mistakes. She lost the large territories of the Russian protectorate of the Commonwealth of Poland and Lithuania and left its territories to Prussia and Austria. The Commonwealth had become the Russian protectorate since the reign of Peter I, but he did not intervene into the problem of political freedoms of dissidents advocating for their religious freedoms only. Catherine did turn Russia into a global great power not only a European one but with quite a different reputation from what she initially had planned as an honest policy. The global trade of Russian natural resources and Russian grain provoked famines, starvation and fear of famines in Russia. Her dynasty lost power because of this and of a war with Austria and Germany, impossible without her foreign policy.

Economics and finance 

Russian economic development was well below the standards in western Europe. Historian François Cruzet writes that Russia under Catherine:

Catherine imposed a comprehensive system of state regulation of merchants' activities. It was a failure because it narrowed and stifled entrepreneurship and did not reward economic development. She had more success when she strongly encouraged the migration of the Volga Germans, farmers from Germany who settled mostly in the Volga River Valley region. They indeed helped modernise the sector that totally dominated the Russian economy. They introduced numerous innovations regarding wheat production and flour milling, tobacco culture, sheep raising, and small-scale manufacturing.

In 1768, the Assignation Bank was given the task of issuing the first government paper money. It opened in Saint Petersburg and Moscow in 1769. Several bank branches were afterwards established in other towns, called government towns. Paper notes were issued upon payment of similar sums in copper money, which were also refunded upon the presentation of those notes. The emergence of these assignation roubles was necessary due to large government spending on military needs, which led to a shortage of silver in the treasury (transactions, especially in foreign trade, were conducted almost exclusively in silver and gold coins). Assignation roubles circulated on equal footing with the silver rouble; a market exchange rate for these two currencies was ongoing. The use of these notes continued until 1849.

Catherine paid a great deal of attention to financial reform, and relied heavily on the advice of Prince A. A. Viazemski. She found that piecemeal reform worked poorly because there was no overall view of a comprehensive state budget. Money was needed for wars and necessitated the junking the old financial institutions. A key principle was responsibilities defined by function. It was instituted by the Fundamental Law of 7 November 1775. Vaizemski's Office of State Revenue took centralised control and by 1781, the government possessed its first approximation of a state budget.

Government organisation
Catherine made public health a priority. She made use of the social theory ideas of German cameralism and French physiocracy, as well as Russian precedents and experiments such as foundling homes. She launched the Moscow Foundling Home and lying-in hospital, 1764, and Paul's Hospital, 1763. She had the government collect and publish vital statistics. In 1762 called on the army to upgrade its medical services. She established a centralised medical administration charged with initiating vigorous health policies. Catherine decided to have herself inoculated against smallpox by Thomas Dimsdale, a British doctor. While this was considered a controversial method at the time, she succeeded. Her son Pavel later was inoculated as well. Catherine then sought to have inoculations throughout her empire and stated: "My objective was, through my example, to save from death the multitude of my subjects who, not knowing the value of this technique, and frightened of it, were left in danger". By 1800, approximately 2 million inoculations (almost 6% of the population) were administered in the Russian Empire. Historians consider her efforts to be a success.

Serfs 

According to a census taken from 1754 to 1762, Catherine owned 500,000 serfs. A further 2.8 million belonged to the Russian state.

Rights and conditions 

At the time of Catherine's reign, the landowning noble class owned the serfs, who were bound to the land they tilled. Children of serfs were born into serfdom and worked the same land their parents had. Even before the rule of Catherine, serfs had very limited rights, but they were not exactly slaves. While the state did not technically allow them to own possessions, some serfs were able to accumulate enough wealth to pay for their freedom. The understanding of law in Imperial Russia by all sections of society was often weak, confused, or nonexistent, particularly in the provinces where most serfs lived. This is why some serfs were able to do things such as to accumulate wealth. To become serfs, people conceded their freedoms to a landowner in exchange for their protection and support in times of hardship. In addition, they received land to till, but were taxed a certain percentage of their crops to give to their landowners. These were the privileges a serf was entitled to and that nobles were bound to carry out. All of this was true before Catherine's reign, and this is the system she inherited.

Catherine did initiate some changes to serfdom. If a noble did not live up to his side of the deal, the serfs could file complaints against him by following the proper channels of law. Catherine gave them this new right, but in exchange they could no longer appeal directly to her. She did this because she did not want to be bothered by the peasantry, but did not want to give them reason to revolt. In this act, she gave the serfs a legitimate bureaucratic status they had lacked before. Some serfs were able to use their new status to their advantage. For example, serfs could apply to be freed if they were under illegal ownership, and non-nobles were not allowed to own serfs. Some serfs did apply for freedom and were successful. In addition, some governors listened to the complaints of serfs and punished nobles, but this was by no means universal.

Other than these, the rights of a serf were very limited. A landowner could punish his serfs at his discretion, and under Catherine the Great gained the ability to sentence his serfs to hard labour in Siberia, a punishment normally reserved for convicted criminals. The only thing a noble could not do to his serfs was to kill them. The life of a serf belonged to the state. Historically, when the serfs faced problems they could not solve on their own (such as abusive masters), they often appealed to the autocrat, and continued doing so during Catherine's reign, but she signed legislation prohibiting it. Although she did not want to communicate directly with the serfs, she did create some measures to improve their conditions as a class and reduce the size of the institution of serfdom. For example, she took action to limit the number of new serfs; she eliminated many ways for people to become serfs, culminating in the manifesto of 17 March 1775, which prohibited a serf who had once been freed from becoming a serf again.

While the majority of serfs were farmers bound to the land, a noble could have his serfs sent away to learn a trade or be educated at a school as well as employ them at businesses that paid wages. This happened more often during Catherine's reign because of the new schools she established. Only in this way apart from conscription to the army could a serf leave the farm for which he was responsible but this was used for selling serfs to people who could not own them legally because of absence of nobility abroad.

Attitudes towards Catherine 

The attitude of the serfs toward their autocrat had historically been a positive one.
However, if the empress' policies were too extreme or too disliked, she was not considered the true empress. In these cases, it was necessary to replace this "fake" empress with the "true" empress, whoever she may be. Because the serfs had no political power, they rioted to convey their message. However, usually, if the serfs did not like the policies of the empress, they saw the nobles as corrupt and evil, preventing the people of Russia from communicating with the well-intentioned empress and misinterpreting her decrees. However, they were already suspicious of Catherine upon her accession because she had annulled an act by Peter III that essentially freed the serfs belonging to the Orthodox Church. Naturally, the serfs did not like it when Catherine tried to take away their right to petition her because they felt as though she had severed their connection to the autocrat, and their power to appeal to her. Far away from the capital, they were confused as to the circumstances of her accession to the throne.

The peasants were discontented because of many other factors as well, including crop failure, and epidemics, especially a major epidemic in 1771. The nobles were imposing a stricter rule than ever, reducing the land of each serf and restricting their freedoms further beginning around 1767. Their discontent led to widespread outbreaks of violence and rioting during Pugachev's Rebellion of 1774. The serfs probably followed someone who was pretending to be the true empress because of their feelings of disconnection to Catherine and her policies empowering the nobles, but this was not the first time they followed a pretender under Catherine's reign. Pugachev had made stories about himself acting as a real emperor should, helping the common people, listening to their problems, praying for them, and generally acting saintly, and this helped rally the peasants and serfs, with their very conservative values, to his cause. With all this discontent in mind, Catherine did rule for 10 years before the anger of the serfs boiled over into a rebellion as extensive as Pugachev's. The rebellion ultimately failed and in fact backfired as Catherine was pushed away from the idea of serf liberation following the violent uprising. Under Catherine's rule, despite her enlightened ideals, the serfs were generally unhappy and discontented.

Arts and culture 

Catherine was a patron of the arts, literature, and education. The Hermitage Museum, which  occupies the whole Winter Palace, began as Catherine's personal collection. The empress was a great lover of art and books, and ordered the construction of the Hermitage in 1770 to house her expanding collection of paintings, sculpture, and books. By 1790, the Hermitage was home to 38,000 books, 10,000 gems and 10,000 drawings. Two wings were devoted to her collections of "curiosities". She ordered the planting of the first "English garden" at Tsarskoye Selo in May 1770. In a letter to Voltaire in 1772, she wrote: "Right now I adore English gardens, curves, gentle slopes, ponds in the form of lakes, archipelagos on dry land, and I have a profound scorn for straight lines, symmetric avenues. I hate fountains that torture water in order to make it take a course contrary to its nature: Statues are relegated to galleries, vestibules etc.; in a word, Anglomania is the master of my plantomania".

Catherine shared in the general European craze for all things Chinese, and made a point of collecting Chinese art and buying porcelain in the popular Chinoiserie style. Between 1762 and 1766, she had built the "Chinese Palace" at Oranienbaum which reflected the chinoiserie style of architecture and gardening. The Chinese Palace was designed by the Italian architect Antonio Rinaldi who specialised in the chinoiserie style. In 1779, she hired the Scottish architect Charles Cameron to build the Chinese Village at Tsarskoye Selo (modern Pushkin, Saint Petersburg). Catherine had at first attempted to hire a Chinese architect to build the Chinese Village, and on finding that was impossible, settled on Cameron, who likewise specialised in the chinoiserie style.

She made a special effort to bring leading intellectuals and scientists to Russia, and she wrote her own comedies, works of fiction, and memoirs. She worked with Voltaire, Diderot, and d'Alembert – all French encyclopedists who later cemented her reputation in their writings. The leading economists of her day, such as Arthur Young and Jacques Necker, became foreign members of the Free Economic Society, established on her suggestion in Saint Petersburg in 1765. She recruited the scientists Leonhard Euler and Peter Simon Pallas from Berlin and Anders Johan Lexell from Sweden to the Russian capital.

Catherine enlisted Voltaire to her cause, and corresponded with him for 15 years, from her accession to his death in 1778. He lauded her accomplishments, calling her "The Star of the North" and the "Semiramis of Russia" (in reference to the legendary Queen of Babylon, a subject on which he published a tragedy in 1768). Although she never met him face to face, she mourned him bitterly when he died. She acquired his collection of books from his heirs, and placed them in the National Library of Russia.

Catherine read three sorts of books, namely those for pleasure, those for information, and those to provide her with a philosophy. In the first category, she read romances and comedies that were popular at the time, many of which were regarded as "inconsequential" by the critics both then and since. She especially liked the work of German comic writers such as Moritz August von Thümmel and Christoph Friedrich Nicolai. In the second category fell the work of Denis Diderot, Jacques Necker, Johann Bernhard Basedow and Georges-Louis Leclerc, Comte de Buffon. Catherine expressed some frustration with the economists she read for what she regarded as their impractical theories, writing in the margin of one of Necker's books that if it was possible to solve all of the state's economic problems in one day, she would have done so a long time ago. For information about particular nations that interested her, she read Jean Baptiste Bourguignon d'Anville's Memoirs de Chine to learn about the vast and wealthy Chinese empire that bordered her empire; François Baron de Tott's Memoires de les Turcs et les Tartares for information about the Ottoman Empire and the Crimean khanate; the books of Frederick the Great praising himself to learn about Frederick just as much as to learn about Prussia; and the pamphlets of Benjamin Franklin denouncing the British Crown to understand the reasons behind the American Revolution. In the third category fell the work of Voltaire, Friedrich Melchior, Baron von Grimm, Ferdinando Galiani, Nicolas Baudeau, and Sir William Blackstone. For philosophy, she liked books promoting what has been called "enlightened despotism", which she embraced as her ideal of an autocratic but reformist government that operated according to the rule of law, not the whims of the ruler, hence her interest in Blackstone's legal commentaries.

Within a few months of her accession in 1762, having heard the French government threatened to stop the publication of the famous French Encyclopédie on account of its irreligious spirit, Catherine proposed to Diderot that he should complete his great work in Russia under her protection. Four years later, in 1766, she endeavoured to embody in legislation the principles of Enlightenment she learned from studying the French philosophers. She called together at Moscow a Grand Commission – almost a consultative parliament – composed of 652 members of all classes (officials, nobles, burghers, and peasants) and of various nationalities. The commission had to consider the needs of the Russian Empire and the means of satisfying them. The empress prepared the "Instructions for the Guidance of the Assembly", pillaging (as she frankly admitted) the philosophers of Western Europe, especially Montesquieu and Cesare Beccaria.

As many of the democratic principles frightened her more moderate and experienced advisors, she refrained from immediately putting them into practice. After holding more than 200 sittings, the so-called Commission dissolved without getting beyond the realm of theory.

Catherine began issuing codes to address some of the modernisation trends suggested in her Nakaz. In 1775, the empress decreed a Statute for the Administration of the Provinces of the Russian Empire. The statute sought to efficiently govern Russia by increasing population and dividing the country into provinces and districts. By the end of her reign, 50 provinces and nearly 500 districts were created, government officials numbering more than double this were appointed, and spending on local government increased sixfold. In 1785, Catherine conferred on the nobility the Charter to the Nobility, increasing the power of the landed oligarchs. Nobles in each district elected a Marshal of the Nobility, who spoke on their behalf to the monarch on issues of concern to them, mainly economic ones. In the same year, Catherine issued the Charter of the Towns, which distributed all people into six groups as a way to limit the power of nobles and create a middle estate. Catherine also issued the Code of Commercial Navigation and Salt Trade Code of 1781, the Police Ordinance of 1782, and the Statute of National Education of 1786. In 1777, the empress described to Voltaire her legal innovations within a backward Russia as progressing "little by little".

During Catherine's reign, Russians imported and studied the classical and European influences that inspired the Russian Enlightenment. Gavrila Derzhavin, Denis Fonvizin and Ippolit Bogdanovich laid the groundwork for the great writers of the 19th century, especially for Alexander Pushkin. Catherine became a great patron of Russian opera. Alexander Radishchev published his Journey from St. Petersburg to Moscow in 1790, shortly after the start of the French Revolution. He warned of uprisings in Russia because of the deplorable social conditions of the serfs. Catherine decided it promoted the dangerous poison of the French Revolution. She had the book burned and the author exiled to Siberia.

Catherine also received Elisabeth Vigée Le Brun at her Tsarskoye Selo residence in St Petersburg, by whom she was painted shortly before her death. Madame Vigée Le Brun vividly describes the empress in her memoirs:

the sight of this famous woman so impressed me that I found it impossible to think of anything: I could only stare at her. Firstly I was very surprised at her small stature; I had imagined her to be very tall, as great as her fame. She was also very fat, but her face was still beautiful, and she wore her white hair up, framing it perfectly. Her genius seemed to rest on her forehead, which was both high and wide. Her eyes were soft and sensitive, her nose quite Greek, her colour high and her features expressive. She addressed me immediately in a voice full of sweetness, if a little throaty: "I am delighted to welcome you here, Madame, your reputation runs before you. I am very fond of the arts, especially painting. I am no connoisseur, but I am a great art lover."

Madame Vigée Le Brun also describes the empress at a gala:

The double doors opened and the Empress appeared. I have said that she was quite small, and yet on the days when she made her public appearances, with her head held high, her eagle-like stare and a countenance accustomed to command, all this gave her such an air of majesty that to me she might have been Queen of the World; she wore the sashes of three orders, and her costume was both simple and regal; it consisted of a muslin tunic embroidered with gold fastened by a diamond belt, and the full sleeves were folded back in the Asiatic style. Over this tunic she wore a red velvet dolman with very short sleeves. The bonnet which held her white hair was not decorated with ribbons, but with the most beautiful diamonds.

Education 

Catherine held western European philosophies and culture close to her heart, and she wanted to surround herself with like-minded people within Russia. She believed a 'new kind of person' could be created by inculcating Russian children with European education. Catherine believed education could change the hearts and minds of the Russian people and turn them away from backwardness. This meant developing individuals both intellectually and morally, providing them knowledge and skills, and fostering a sense of civic responsibility. Her goal was to modernise education across Russia.

Catherine appointed Ivan Betskoy as her advisor on educational matters. Through him, she collected information from Russia and other countries about educational institutions. She also established a commission composed of T.N. Teplov, T. von Klingstedt, F.G. Dilthey, and the historian G. Muller. She consulted British education pioneers, particularly the Rev. Daniel Dumaresq and Dr John Brown. In 1764, she sent for Dumaresq to come to Russia and then appointed him to the educational commission. The commission studied the reform projects previously installed by I.I. Shuvalov under Elizabeth and under Peter III. They submitted recommendations for the establishment of a general system of education for all Russian orthodox subjects from the age of 5 to 18, excluding serfs. However, no action was taken on any recommendations put forth by the commission due to the calling of the Legislative Commission. In July 1765, Dumaresq wrote to Dr. John Brown about the commission's problems and received a long reply containing very general and sweeping suggestions for education and social reforms in Russia. Dr. Brown argued, in a democratic country, education ought to be under the state's control and based on an education code. He also placed great emphasis on the "proper and effectual education of the female sex"; two years prior, Catherine had commissioned Ivan Betskoy to draw up the General Programme for the Education of Young People of Both Sexes. This work emphasised the fostering of the creation of a 'new kind of people' raised in isolation from the damaging influence of a backward Russian environment. The Establishment of the Moscow Foundling Home (Moscow Orphanage) was the first attempt at achieving that goal. It was charged with admitting destitute and extramarital children to educate them in any way the state deemed fit. Because the Moscow Foundling Home was not established as a state-funded institution, it represented an opportunity to experiment with new educational theories. However, the Moscow Foundling Home was unsuccessful, mainly due to extremely high mortality rates, which prevented many of the children from living long enough to develop into the enlightened subjects the state desired.

Not long after the Moscow Foundling Home, at the instigation of her factotum, Ivan Betskoy, she wrote a manual for the education of young children, drawing from the ideas of John Locke, and founded the famous Smolny Institute in 1764, first of its kind in Russia. At first, the institute only admitted young girls of the noble elite, but eventually it began to admit girls of the petit-bourgeoisie as well. The girls who attended the Smolny Institute, Smolyanki, were often accused of being ignorant of anything that went on in the world outside the walls of the Smolny buildings, within which they acquired a proficiency in French, music, and dancing, along with a complete awe of the monarch. Central to the institute's philosophy of pedagogy was strict enforcement of discipline. Running and games were forbidden, and the building was kept particularly cold because too much warmth was believed to be harmful to the developing body, as was excessive play.

From 1768 to 1774, no progress was made in setting up a national school system. However, Catherine continued to investigate the pedagogical principles and practice of other countries and made many other educational reforms, including an overhaul of the Cadet Corps in 1766. The Corps then began to take children from a very young age and educate them until the age of 21, with a broadened curriculum that included the sciences, philosophy, ethics, history, and international law. These reforms in the Cadet Corps influenced the curricula of the Naval Cadet Corps and the Engineering and Artillery Schools. Following the war and the defeat of Pugachev, Catherine laid the obligation to establish schools at the guberniya – a provincial subdivision of the Russian empire ruled by a governor – on the Boards of Social Welfare set up with the participation of elected representatives from the three free estates.

By 1782, Catherine arranged another advisory commission to review the information she had gathered on the educational systems of many different countries. One system that particularly stood out was produced by a mathematician, Franz Aepinus. He was strongly in favour of the adoption of the Austrian three-tier model of trivial, real, and normal schools at the village, town, and provincial capital levels.

In addition to the advisory commission, Catherine established a Commission of National Schools under Pyotr Zavadovsky. This commission was charged with organising a national school network, as well as providing teacher training and textbooks. On 5 August 1786, the Russian Statute of National Education was created. The statute established a two-tier network of high schools and primary schools in guberniya capitals that were free of charge, open to all of the free classes (not serfs), and co-educational. It also stipulated in detail the subjects to be taught at every age and the method of teaching. In addition to the textbooks translated by the commission, teachers were provided with the "Guide to Teachers". This work, divided into four parts, dealt with teaching methods, subject matter, teacher conduct, and school administration.

Despite these efforts, later historians of the 19th century were generally critical. Some claimed Catherine failed to supply enough money to support her educational program. Two years after the implementation of Catherine's program, a member of the National Commission inspected the institutions established. Throughout Russia, the inspectors encountered a patchy response. While the nobility provided appreciable amounts of money for these institutions, they preferred to send their own children to private, prestigious institutions. Also, the townspeople tended to turn against the junior schools and their pedagogical methods. Yet by the end of Catherine's reign, an estimated 62,000 pupils were being educated in some 549 state institutions. While a significant improvement, it was only a minuscule number, compared to the size of the Russian population.

Religious affairs 

Catherine's apparent embrace of all things Russian (including Orthodoxy) may have prompted her personal indifference to religion. She nationalised all of the church lands to help pay for her wars, largely emptied the monasteries, and forced most of the remaining clergymen to survive as farmers or from fees for baptisms and other services. Very few members of the nobility entered the church, which became even less important than it had been. She did not allow dissenters to build chapels, and she suppressed religious dissent after the onset of the French Revolution.

However, in accord with her anti-Ottoman policy, Catherine promoted the protection and fostering of Christians under Turkish rule. She placed strictures on Catholics (ukaz of 23 February 1769), mainly Polish, and attempted to assert and extend state control over them in the wake of the partitions of Poland. Nevertheless, Catherine's Russia provided an asylum and a base for regrouping to the Jesuits following the suppression of the Jesuits in most of Europe in 1773.

Islam 

Catherine took many different approaches to Islam during her reign. She avoided force and tried persuasion (and money) to integrate Muslim areas into her empire. Between 1762 and 1773, Muslims were prohibited from owning any Orthodox serfs. They were pressured into Orthodoxy through monetary incentives. Catherine promised more serfs of all religions, as well as amnesty for convicts, if Muslims chose to convert to Orthodoxy. However, the Legislative Commission of 1767 offered several seats to people professing the Islamic faith. This commission promised to protect their religious rights, but did not do so. Many Orthodox peasants felt threatened by the sudden change, and burned mosques as a sign of their displeasure. Catherine chose to assimilate Islam into the state rather than eliminate it when public outcry became too disruptive. After the "Toleration of All Faiths" Edict of 1773, Muslims were permitted to build mosques and practise all of their traditions, the most obvious of these being the pilgrimage to Mecca, which previously had been denied. Catherine created the Orenburg Muslim Spiritual Assembly to help regulate Muslim-populated regions as well as regulate the instruction and ideals of mullahs. The positions on the Assembly were appointed and paid for by Catherine and her government as a way of regulating religious affairs.

In 1785, Catherine approved the subsidising of new mosques and new town settlements for Muslims. This was another attempt to organise and passively control the outer fringes of her country. By building new settlements with mosques placed in them, Catherine attempted to ground many of the nomadic people who wandered through southern Russia. In 1786, she assimilated the Islamic schools into the Russian public school system under government regulation. The plan was another attempt to force nomadic people to settle. This allowed the Russian government to control more people, especially those who previously had not fallen under the jurisdiction of Russian law.

Judaism 

Russia often treated Judaism as a separate entity, where Jews were maintained with a separate legal and bureaucratic system. Although the government knew that Judaism existed, Catherine and her advisers had no real definition of what a Jew is because the term meant many things during her reign. Judaism was a small, if not non-existent, religion in Russia until 1772. When Catherine agreed to the First Partition of Poland, the large new Jewish element was treated as a separate people, defined by their religion. Catherine separated the Jews from Orthodox society, restricting them to the Pale of Settlement. She levied additional taxes on the followers of Judaism; if a family converted to the Orthodox faith, that additional tax was lifted. Jewish members of society were required to pay double the tax of their Orthodox neighbours. Converted Jews could gain permission to enter the merchant class and farm as free peasants under Russian rule.

In an attempt to assimilate the Jews into Russia's economy, Catherine included them under the rights and laws of the Charter of the Towns of 1782. Orthodox Russians disliked the inclusion of Judaism, mainly for economic reasons. Catherine tried to keep the Jews away from certain economic spheres, even under the guise of equality; in 1790, she banned Jewish citizens from Moscow's middle class.

In 1785, Catherine declared Jews to be officially foreigners, with foreigners' rights. This re-established the separate identity that Judaism maintained in Russia throughout the Jewish Haskalah. Catherine's decree also denied Jews the rights of an Orthodox or naturalised citizen of Russia. Taxes doubled again for those of Jewish descent in 1794, and Catherine officially declared that Jews bore no relation to Russians.

Russian Orthodoxy 

In many ways, the Orthodox Church fared no better than its foreign counterparts during the reign of Catherine. Under her leadership, she completed what Peter III had started. The church's lands were expropriated, and the budget of both monasteries and bishoprics were controlled by the Collegium of Accounting. Endowments from the government replaced income from privately held lands. The endowments were often much less than the original intended amount. She closed 569 of 954 monasteries, of which only 161 received government money. Only 400,000 roubles of church wealth were paid back. While other religions (such as Islam) received invitations to the Legislative Commission, the Orthodox clergy did not receive a single seat. Their place in government was restricted severely during the years of Catherine's reign.

In 1762, to help mend the rift between the Orthodox church and a sect that called themselves the Old Believers, Catherine passed an act that allowed Old Believers to practise their faith openly without interference. While claiming religious tolerance, she intended to recall the Old Believers into the official church. They refused to comply, and in 1764, she deported over 20,000 Old Believers to Siberia on the grounds of their faith. In later years, Catherine amended her thoughts. Old Believers were allowed to hold elected municipal positions after the Urban Charter of 1785, and she promised religious freedom to those who wished to settle in Russia.

Religious education was reviewed strictly. At first, she attempted to revise clerical studies, proposing a reform of religious schools. This reform never progressed beyond the planning stages. By 1786, Catherine excluded all religion and clerical studies programs from lay education. By separating the public interests from those of the church, Catherine began a secularisation of the day-to-day workings of Russia. She transformed the clergy from a group that wielded great power over the Russian government and its people to a segregated community forced to depend on the state for compensation.

Personal life 

Catherine, throughout her long reign, took many lovers, often elevating them to high positions for as long as they held her interest and then pensioning them off with gifts of serfs and large estates. The percentage of state money spent on the court increased from 10% in 1767 to 11% in 1781 to 14% in 1795. Catherine gave away 66,000 serfs from 1762 to 1772, 202,000 from 1773 to 1793, and 100,000 in one day: 18 August 1795. Catherine bought the support of the bureaucracy. In 1767, Catherine decreed that after seven years in one rank, civil servants automatically would be promoted regardless of office or merit.

After her affair with her lover and adviser Grigory Potemkin ended in 1776, he allegedly selected a candidate-lover for her who had the physical beauty and mental faculties to hold her interest (such as Alexander Dmitriev-Mamonov and Nicholas Alexander Suk). Some of these men loved her in return, and she always showed generosity towards them, even after the affair ended. One of her lovers, Pyotr Zavadovsky, received 50,000 roubles, a pension of 5,000 roubles, and 4,000 peasants in Ukraine after she dismissed him in 1777. The last of her lovers, Platon Zubov, was 40 years her junior. Her sexual independence led to many of the legends about her.

Catherine kept her illegitimate son by Grigory Orlov (Alexis Bobrinsky, later elevated to Count Bobrinsky by Paul I) near Tula, away from her court.

Elite acceptance of a woman ruler was more of an issue in Western Europe than in Russia. The British ambassador James Harris, 1st Earl of Malmesbury, reported back to London:

Poniatowski 

Sir Charles Hanbury Williams, the British ambassador to Russia, offered Stanislaus Poniatowski a place in the embassy in return for gaining Catherine as an ally. Poniatowski, through his mother's side, came from the Czartoryski family, prominent members of the pro-Russian faction in Poland; Poniatowski and Catherine were eighth cousins, twice removed, by their mutual ancestor King Christian I of Denmark, by virtue of Poniatowski's maternal descent from the Scottish House of Stuart. Catherine, 26 years old and already married to the then-Grand Duke Peter for some 10 years, met the 22-year-old Poniatowski in 1755, therefore well before encountering the Orlov brothers. In 1757, Poniatowski served in the British Army during the Seven Years' War, thus severing close relationships with Catherine. She bore him a daughter named Anna Petrovna in December 1757 (not to be confused with Grand Duchess Anna Petrovna of Russia, the daughter of Peter I's second marriage), although she was legally regarded as Grand Duke Peter's.

King Augustus III of Poland died in 1763, so Poland needed to elect a new ruler. Catherine supported Poniatowski as a candidate to become the next king. She sent the Russian army into Poland to avoid possible disputes. Russia invaded Poland on 26 August 1764, threatening to fight, and imposing Poniatowski as king. Poniatowski accepted the throne, and thereby put himself under Catherine's control. News of Catherine's plan spread, and Frederick II (others say the Ottoman sultan) warned her that if she tried to conquer Poland by marrying Poniatowski, all of Europe would oppose her. She had no intention of marrying him, having already given birth to Orlov's child and to the Grand Duke Paul by then.

Prussia (through the agency of Prince Henry), Russia (under Catherine), and Austria (under Maria Theresa) began preparing the ground for the partitions of Poland. In the first partition, 1772, the three powers split  among them. Russia got territories east of the line connecting, more or less, Riga–Polotsk–Mogilev. In the second partition, in 1793, Russia received the most land, from west of Minsk almost to Kiev and down the river Dnieper, leaving some spaces of steppe down south in front of Ochakov, on the Black Sea. Later uprisings in Poland led to the third partition in 1795. Poland ceased to exist as an independent nation until its post-WWI reconstitution.

Orlov 
Grigory Orlov, the grandson of a rebel in the Streltsy Uprising (1698) against Peter the Great, distinguished himself in the Battle of Zorndorf (25 August 1758), receiving three wounds. He represented an opposite to Peter's pro-Prussian sentiment, with which Catherine disagreed. By 1759, he and Catherine had become lovers; no one told Catherine's husband, the Grand Duke Peter. Catherine saw Orlov as very useful, and he became instrumental in the 28 June 1762 coup d'état against her husband, but she preferred to remain the dowager empress of Russia rather than marrying anyone.

Grigory Orlov and his other three brothers found themselves rewarded with titles, money, swords, and other gifts, but Catherine did not marry Grigory, who proved inept at politics and useless when asked for advice. He received a palace in Saint Petersburg when Catherine became empress.

Orlov died in 1783. Their son, Aleksey Grygoriovich Bobrinsky (1762–1813), had one daughter, Maria Alexeyeva Bobrinsky (Bobrinskaya) (1798–1835), who married in 1819 the 34-year-old Prince Nikolai Sergeevich Gagarin (London, England, 1784–1842) who took part in the Battle of Borodino (7 September 1812) against Napoleon, and later served as ambassador in Turin, the capital of the Kingdom of Sardinia.

Potemkin 

Grigory Potemkin was involved in the palace coup of 1762. In 1772, Catherine's close friends informed her of Orlov's affairs with other women, and she dismissed him. By the winter of 1773, the Pugachev revolt had started to threaten. Catherine's son Paul had started gaining support; both of these trends threatened her power. She called Potemkin for help – mostly military – and he became devoted to her.

In 1772, Catherine wrote to Potemkin. Days earlier, she had found out about an uprising in the Volga region. She appointed General Aleksandr Bibikov to put down the uprising, but she needed Potemkin's advice on military strategy. Potemkin quickly gained positions and awards. Russian poets wrote about his virtues, the court praised him, foreign ambassadors fought for his favour, and his family moved into the palace. He later became the de facto absolute ruler of New Russia, governing its colonisation.

In 1780, Emperor Joseph II, the son of Holy Roman Empress Maria Theresa, toyed with the idea of determining whether or not to enter an alliance with Russia, and asked to meet Catherine. Potemkin had the task of briefing him and travelling with him to Saint Petersburg. Potemkin also convinced Catherine to expand the universities in Russia to increase the number of scientists.

Catherine was worried that Potemkin's poor health would delay his important work in colonising and developing the south as he had planned. He died at the age of 52 in 1791.

Final months and death 

Catherine's life and reign included many personal successes, but they ended in two failures. Her Swedish cousin (once removed), King Gustav IV Adolf, visited her in September 1796, the empress's intention being that her granddaughter Alexandra should become queen of Sweden by marriage. A ball was given at the imperial court on 11 September when the engagement was supposed to be announced. Gustav Adolph felt pressured to accept that Alexandra would not convert to Lutheranism, and though he was delighted by the young lady, he refused to appear at the ball and left for Stockholm. The frustration affected Catherine's health. She recovered well enough to begin to plan a ceremony which would establish her favourite grandson Alexander as her heir, superseding her difficult son Paul, but she died before the announcement could be made, just over two months after the engagement ball.

On , Catherine rose early in the morning and had her usual morning coffee, soon settling down to work on papers; she told her lady's maid, Maria Perekusikhina, that she had slept better than she had in a long time. Sometime after 9:00 she was found on the floor with her face purplish, her pulse weak, her breathing shallow and laboured. The court physician diagnosed a stroke and despite attempts to revive her, she fell into a coma. She was given the last rites and died the following evening around 9:45. An autopsy confirmed a stroke as the cause of death.

Later, several rumours circulated regarding the cause and manner of her death. The most famous of these rumors is that she died after having sex with her horse. This rumor was widely circulated by satirical British and French publications at the time of her death. In his 1647 book Beschreibung der muscowitischen und persischen Reise (Description of the Muscovite and Persian journey), German scholar Adam Olearius Olearius's claims about a supposed Russian tendency towards bestiality with horses was often repeated in anti-Russian literature throughout the 17th and 18th centuries to illustrate the alleged barbarous "Asian" nature of Russia. Given the frequency which this story was repeated together with Catherine's love of her adopted homeland and her love of horses, it is likely that these details were conflated into this rumor. Catherine had been targeted for being unmarried.

Catherine's undated will, discovered in early 1792 among her papers by her secretary Alexander Vasilievich Khrapovitsky, gave specific instructions should she die: "Lay out my corpse dressed in white, with a golden crown on my head, and on it inscribe my Christian name. Mourning dress is to be worn for six months, and no longer: the shorter the better." In the end, the empress was laid to rest with a gold crown on her head and clothed in a silver brocade dress. On 25 November, the coffin, richly decorated in gold fabric, was placed atop an elevated platform at the Grand Gallery's chamber of mourning, designed and decorated by Antonio Rinaldi. According to Élisabeth Vigée Le Brun: "The empress's body lay in state for six weeks in a large and magnificently decorated room in the castle, which was kept lit day and night. Catherine was stretched on a ceremonial bed surrounded by the coats of arms of all the towns in Russia. Her face was left uncovered, and her fair hand rested on the bed. All the ladies, some of whom took turn to watch by the body, would go and kiss this hand, or at least appear to." A description of the empress's funeral is written in Madame Vigée Le Brun's memoirs.

Issue

Title 
The Manifesto of 1763 begins with Catherine's title:

Archives
Empress Catherine's correspondence with Frederick II Eugene, Duke of Württemberg, (the father of Catherine's daughter-in-law Maria Feodorovna) written between 1768 and 1795, is preserved in the State Archive of Stuttgart (Hauptstaatsarchiv Stuttgart) in Stuttgart, Germany.

In popular culture

Empress Catherine appears as a character in Lord Byron's unfinished mock-heroic poem Don Juan.
She was a subject in The Royal Diaries series in the book Catherine: The Great Journey, Russia, 1743–1745 by Kristiana Gregory. 
The Empress is parodied in Offenbach's operetta La Grande-Duchesse de Gérolstein (1867).
Ernst Lubitsch's silent film Forbidden Paradise (1924) told the story of Catherine's romance with an officer.
Marlene Dietrich portrayed Catherine the Great in the film The Scarlet Empress (1934).
The Rise of Catherine the Great (1934) is a film starring Elisabeth Bergner and Douglas Fairbanks Jr.
Lubitsch remade his 1924 silent film as the sound film A Royal Scandal (1945), also known as Czarina.
Mae West published Catherine Was Great in 1944, starring in it then and in subsequent productions.
Jeanne Moreau played a version of Catherine in the farce comedy film Great Catherine (1968).
The Yugoslav new-wave band EKV (Ekaterina Velika) was named after Catherine.
The British/Canadian/American TV miniseries Young Catherine (1991), starring Julia Ormond as Catherine and Vanessa Redgrave as Empress Elizabeth, is based on Catherine's early life.
The television movie Catherine the Great (1995) stars Catherine Zeta-Jones as Catherine and Jeanne Moreau as Empress Elizabeth.
Actress Olga Antonova played the role of the Empress in the 2000 film The Captain's Daughter, based on the novel of the same name by Alexander Pushkin.
Her rise to power and reign are portrayed in the award-winning Russia-1 television series Ekaterina, which has been extended for a second season in 2017 and a third season in 2019.
The Channel One Russia television series Catherine the Great was released in 2015.
The song "Catherine the Great" from the album Foreverland by The Divine Comedy was released as a single on the 24th of June, 2016. 
Catherine (portrayed by Meghan Tonjes) is featured in the web series Epic Rap Battles of History, in the episode "Alexander the Great vs. Ivan the Terrible" (12 July 2016), pitted against the titular characters, as well as Frederick the Great and Pompey the Great.
The television miniseries Catherine the Great (2019) stars Helen Mirren.
She is portrayed by Elle Fanning in the Hulu television series The Great (2020).
She appears as a leader of the Russian civilization in Civilization games II, III, IV and V.

See also 
 Legends of Catherine the Great
 Potemkin village
 Family tree of Russian monarchs

References

Explanatory notes

Citations

General and cited sources 

 

 
 

 

 

 
 

 
  (Translation of a 19th-century work.)

Further reading 

 
 Bilbasov, Vasily A. History of Catherine the Great. Berlin: Publishing Frederick Gottgeyner, 1900. At Runivers.ru in DjVu and PDF formats
 Bogdanovich, Modest I. Russian army in the age of the Empress Catherine II. Saint Petersburg: Printing office of the Department of inheritance, 1873. At Runivers.ru in DjVu and PDF formats
 Brickner, Alexander Gustavovich. History of Catherine the Great. Saint Petersburg: Typography of A. Suvorin, 1885. At Runivers.ru in DjVu and PDF formats
 Catherine the Great. The Memoirs of Catherine the Great by Markus Cruse and Hilde Hoogenboom (translators). New York: Modern Library, 2005 (hardcover); 2006 (paperback)
 Cronin, Vincent. Catherine, Empress of All the Russias. London: Collins, 1978 (hardcover); 1996 (paperback)
 Dixon, Simon. Catherine the Great (Profiles in Power). Harlow, UK: Longman, 2001 (paperback)
 Herman, Eleanor. Sex With the Queen. New York: HarperCollins, 2006 (hardcover).
 LeDonne, John P. Ruling Russia: Politics & Administration in the Age of Absolutism, 1762–1796 (1984). 
 Malecka, Anna. "Did Orlov Buy the Orlov", Gems and Jewellery, July 2014, pp. 10–12.
 
 Nikolaev, Vsevolod, and Albert Parry. The Loves of Catherine the Great (1982).
 Ransel, David L.  The Politics of Catherinian Russia: The Panin Party (Yale UP, 1975).
 Sette, Alessandro. "Catherine II and the Socio-Economic Origins of the Jewish Question in Russia", Annales Universitatis Apulensis - Series Historica, 23#2 (2019): 47–63.
 Smith, Douglas, ed. and trans. Love and Conquest: Personal Correspondence of Catherine the Great and Prince Grigory Potemkin. DeKalb, IL: Northern Illinois UP, 2004 (hardcover); 2005 (paperback )
 Troyat, Henri. Catherine the Great. New York: Dorset Press, 1991 (hardcover); London: Orion, 2000 (paperback) popular
 Troyat, Henri. Terrible Tsarinas. New York: Algora, 2001.

External links 

 
 Some of the code of laws mentioned above, along with other information
 
 Information about the Battle of Svenskund and the war
 Biography of Catherine the Great, Empress of Russia
 Briefly about Catherine: 
 Family tree of the ancestors of Catherine the Great at the Wayback Machine (archived 11 September 2007) 
 
 Diaries and Letters: Catherine II – German Princess Who Came to Rule Russia at the Wayback Machine (archived 29 June 2015)
 
 
  – Historical reconstruction "The Romanovs". StarMedia. Babich-Design (Russia, 2013)

 
1729 births
1796 deaths
18th-century art collectors
18th-century Russian monarchs
18th-century people from the Russian Empire
18th-century women from the Russian Empire
18th-century women rulers
Burials at Saints Peter and Paul Cathedral, Saint Petersburg
Converts to Eastern Orthodoxy from Lutheranism
Denis Diderot
Duchesses of Holstein-Gottorp
Eastern Orthodox monarchs
German art collectors
House of Ascania
House of Holstein-Gottorp-Romanov
Leaders who took power by coup
Members of the Prussian Academy of Sciences
Mistresses of Stanisław August Poniatowski
People from Szczecin
People of the Caucasian War
People of the Russo-Persian Wars
People of the War of the Bavarian Succession
Recipients of the Order of St. George of the First Degree
Recipients of the Order of the White Eagle (Poland)
Russian art collectors
Russian empresses consorts
Russian empresses regnant
Russian grand duchesses by marriage
Russian Orthodox Christians from Russia
Russian people of German descent
Women art collectors